Baseball Girl is a 2019 South Korean drama sports film written and directed by Choi Yoon-tae, starring Lee Joo-young, Lee Joon-hyuk, Yeom Hye-ran, Song Young-kyu and Kwak Dong-yeon. It was released in theaters on June 18, 2020.

The film had its world premiere at the 24th Busan International Film Festival on October 4, 2019, in the "Korean Cinema Today - Panorama" category.

Plot
The story of Joo Soo-in who is determined to become the first female baseball player to join a professional team.

Cast
 Lee Joo-young as Joo Soo-in
 Lee Joon-hyuk as Choi Jin-tae
 Yeom Hye-ran as Shin Hae-sook
 Song Young-kyu as Soo-in's father
 Kwak Dong-yeon as Lee Jung-ho
 Joo Hae-eun as Han Bang-geul
 Lee Chae-eun as Teacher Kim
 Kim Jong-soo as Coach Park
 Yoo Jae-myung as Head

Production

Development
Choi Yoon-tae was inspired to write this film in 2017 after he watched the interview of a female baseball player. He added that "when [he] told [his] wife that there is no current rule banning women from playing on a professional baseball team, she seemed surprised; so [he] thought it would be interesting to write a story on an aspiring female baseball player."

Casting
On November 16, 2018, Lee Joo-young was cast as the protagonist of Baseball Girl. On November 20, Lee Joon-hyuk's agency confirmed that the actor would be starring in the film, playing a high school baseball coach who helps Joo Soo-in achieve her dream. On November 28, Yeom Hye-ran joined the main cast in the role of Soo-in's mother. Kwak Dong-yeon was confirmed on January 4, 2019, for the role of a high school baseball player, followed by Lee Chae-eun on January 15 for the role of Soo-in's Japanese teacher.

Filming
Principal photography began in January 2019 and filming ended in February, a period during which baseball players usually cannot train due to the cold weather, which made filming more difficult in addition to the small budget.

Release
Baseball Girl premiered at the 24th Busan International Film Festival on October 4, 2019, in the presence of director Choi Yoon-tae and actors Lee Joo-young, Lee Joon-hyuk and Yeom Hye-ran. GV screenings took place on October 4 and 5 at Lotte Cinema Centum City and a general screening was held on October 9 at Lotte Cinema Daeyoung. Tickets were sold out soon after they went on sale for both screenings.

The film hit theaters on June 18, 2020.

Reception

Critical response
At the Busan International Film Festival, the media, critics and audience praised Lee Joo-young's acting as well as Soo-in's passion, her determination to keep running towards her dream and not giving up despite prejudice against her gender.

Accolades

References

External links
 
 
 

2019 films
2010s Korean-language films
South Korean sports drama films
South Korean baseball films
2010s South Korean films